Ryan Bell may refer to:

Ryan Bell (basketball) (born 1984), Canadian basketball player
Ryan J. Bell (born 1971), American former Seventh-day Adventist pastor